Li Jianhua (born September 1954) is a Chinese politician who served as Communist Party Secretary of the Ningxia Hui Autonomous Region between 2013 and 2017.

Career
Li Jianhua was born in Gucheng County, Hebei in 1954. He enlisted in the People's Liberation Army from December 1969 to February 1973, and joined the Chinese Communist Party in May 1975.

From 1978 to 2011 Li rose through the ranks of the Organization Department of the Chinese Communist Party, with a brief stint as the head of the Organization Department of Sichuan province from 2000 to 2002. From 2003 to 2011 he served as the deputy head of the Organization Department of the Central Committee. From 2011 to 2013 he was the party secretary and vice president of China National School of Administration, a minister-level position.

In March 2013 Li Jianhua was appointed Communist Party Secretary of Ningxia Hui Autonomous Region, replacing Zhang Yi as the top leader of the province-level region. He left the post in 2017, at age 62. In June, he joined a committee on the Chinese People's Political Consultative Conference.

Li was a member of the 18th Central Committee of the Chinese Communist Party.

References

Living people
1954 births
Chinese Communist Party politicians from Hebei
People's Republic of China politicians from Hebei
Political office-holders in Ningxia
Political office-holders in Sichuan